Stüssy is an American privately held fashion house founded in the early 1980s by Shawn Stussy. It benefited from the surfwear trend originating in Orange County, California, but was later adopted by the skateboard and hip hop scenes.

History
Shawn Stussy (born 1954), was a Californian manufacturer of surfboards. The logo defining the brand started in the early 1980s, when he scrawled his surname on handcrafted boards with a simple broad-tipped marker. He then used the logo on T-shirts, shorts and caps that he sold out of his car around Laguna Beach, California. The signature was derived from that of his uncle, Jan Stussy. A stylized "S" popular in the 1990s, called the "Cool S", is often mistakenly attributed to the brand.
 
In 1984, Stussy and his friend, Frank Sinatra Jr. (no relation to the singer), partnered to sell the apparel. The company expanded into Europe by 1988, opened a boutique in SoHo, New York, and unveiled multiple other locations throughout the 1990s. Revenues reached $17 million in 1991, and $20 million in 1992. Stüssy was sold throughout the United States at both specialty and department stores alongside other high-priced "California lifestyle" clothing during this era. Outside of the US, the brand was available in specialty shops alongside high-end international design clothing.

In 1996, Stussy resigned as president and Sinatra bought his share of the company holdings, with the Sinatra family still owning the brand in 2017. According to the company's website, the apparel is available in branded stores and other retailers in Europe, Asia, the United States, Canada and Australia.

Style
The early success of the brand has been attributed to its popularity in the hip hop and skateboarding/surfer scenes. The brand was also embraced by the punk and other subcultures. In a 1992 interview Stussy said, "Everybody calls it surf wear, or urban streetwear, punk, or surf street... I don't name it, and I don't name it on purpose."

Collaborations 
In 2011, Marvel paired up with Stüssy for an extensive line split between two series. The first, released on 27 April, had nine T-shirt designs depicting several of the comics' most popular superheroes combined with Stüssy's graphic language. The second was made up of designs from nine guest artists who interpreted their favorite characters from the Marvel Universe. In 2019, Stüssy partnered up with fashion designer Matthew Williams to release two products: a garment dyed tee made of recycled organic cotton and a pair of co-branded leather hiking boots. The next year, Williams announced a new partnership with the brand for denim products and in late 2020, the brand partnered with CDG to create a capsule collection in commemoration of Stüssy's 40th anniversary.

References

External links

Clothing brands of the United States
Surfwear brands
1990s fashion
Street fashion
Clothing companies based in Los Angeles